Santa Fe is a city in Galveston County, Texas, United States. It is named for the Santa Fe Railroad (now part of BNSF Railway) which runs through the town alongside State Highway 6. The population of Santa Fe at the 2010 census was 12,222.

History
In 1877, the Gulf, Colorado and Santa Fe Railway was built through the western part of Galveston county. By the turn of the century, three small, unincorporated towns had formed along the railway: Alta Loma, Arcadia, and Algoa. The Santa Fe Independent School District which was named after the railway, was established shortly afterward to serve the area.

In the mid-1970s, the neighboring city of Hitchcock attempted to annex an area in eastern Alta Loma known as the Morningview neighborhood. Amid intense opposition to becoming part of Hitchcock, residents began a petitioning effort to incorporate the area into a new city. On January 21, 1978, a ballot proposal to incorporate Alta Loma and parts of Arcadia passed by a wide margin and the city of Santa Fe was born. Santa Fe has since grown to include all of Arcadia and parts of Algoa, and ironically is now twice the size of Hitchcock.

On February 14, 1981, the Ku Klux Klan hosted a fish fry on a private farm in Santa Fe to protest the growing presence of Vietnamese shrimpers in the Gulf. During the event, a Vietnamese fishing boat was ceremonially burned. The controversy and similar conflicts in nearby port towns like Rockport, led to a decision of the United States District Court, S.D. Texas, Houston Division Vietnamese Fishermen's Association v. Knights of the Ku Klux Klan, and also was the basis of the story for the 1985 Ed Harris film Alamo Bay.

On June 19, 2000, the Supreme Court ruled that the Santa Fe Independent School District's policy of permitting "student-led, student-initiated" prayer at football games and other school events violated the Constitution's prohibitions against the establishment of state religion.

On the morning of May 18, 2018, a school shooting occurred at Santa Fe High School when 17-year-old student Dimitrios Pagourtzis opened fire in an art classroom, killing ten students including Sabika Sheikh, 17 (an exchange student from Pakistan) and faculty and injuring thirteen others. Students and faculty evacuated the building when a fire alarm was activated. Pagourtzis surrendered after being injured in an exchange of gunfire with school officers. Originally scheduled to stand trial in January 2020 for ten counts of capital murder, Pagourtzis has been in custody at a state mental hospital since being found unfit to stand trial in November 2019.

Geography and climate

The primary waterways are Highland Bayou and Halls Bayou, which both flow southeastward and empty into West Bay. Being prone to flash flooding, the area is lined with numerous drainage ditches, culverts, diversionary canals and reservoirs.

In 2019 Skip Hollandworth of Texas Monthly wrote that Santa Fe "still feels very much like a small town" despite that distance.

Santa Fe has a climate of hot, humid summers and cool, mild winters.  Average annual temperature is 68.6 degrees F with 56.5 inches of annual rainfall.  Santa Fe averages 71.7 days above 90 degrees F.  In the Köppen Climate Classification system, Santa Fe has a humid subtropical climate, abbreviated "Cfa."

Demographics

2020 census

As of the 2020 United States census, there were 12,735 people, 4,744 households, and 3,449 families residing in the city.

2010 census

As of the census of 2010, there were 12,222 people and 4,564 households residing in the city. The population density was 682.5 people per square mile (275.31/km). There were 4,957 housing units at an average density of 289.2 per square mile (111.66/km). The racial makeup of the city was 93.8% White, 0.4% African American, 0.5% Native American, 0.5% Asian, 0.1% Pacific Islander, 3.3% from other races, and 1.5% from two or more races. Hispanic or Latino of any race were 11.6% of the population.

There were 4,583 households, out of which 36.8% had children under the age of 18 living with them, 57.7% were married couples, 12.2% had a female householder with no husband present, and 23.7% were non-families. Among all households, 27.0% were made up of individuals, and 19.3% had someone living alone who was 65 years of age or older. The average household size was 2.67 and the average family size was 3.03.

In the city, the population was spread out, with 27.2% under the age of 20, 5.2% from 20 to 24, 23.9% from 25 to 44, 29.6% from 45 to 64, and 14.3% who were 65 years of age or older. The median age was 40.5 years. For every 100 females, there were 99.6 males. For every 100 females age 18 and over, there were 97.2 males.

The median income for a household in the city was $60,797, and the median income for a family was $69,841. Males had a median income of $57,619 versus $36,445 for females. The per capita income for the city was $27,863. About 7.3% of families and 9.5% of the population were below the poverty line, including 12.3% of those under age 18 and 5.7% of those age 65 or over.

Government and infrastructure
Santa Fe City Hall is located at 12002 Highway 6. The city council consists of a mayor and five councilmembers. The Santa Fe Post Office is located at 13002 Highway 6.

The Santa Fe Justice Center is located at 3650 FM 646 N.

Education

Secondary schools 

Public schools 
The city is served by the Santa Fe Independent School District.

The schools in the city include:

 R.J. Wollam Elementary School (Pre-K through 5)
 Dan J. Kubacak Elementary (Pre-K through 5; formerly Santa Fe Elementary North) 
 Barnett Elementary (Pre-K through 5; newest school in the city)
 Santa Fe Junior High School (6–8)
 Santa Fe High School (9–12)

Public libraries
The Mae S. Bruce Library at 13302 6th Street was given to the city by Mae S. Bruce. The Santa Fe Community Library opened inside a former World War II army barracks in 1975. By 2011 the barracks became overwhelmed by the library's increasing size. A group of residents established a building committee; with Moody Foundation and Kempner Fund grants and donations from the community they purchased a  metal portable building on land leased from the Santa Fe Independent School District. The portable library was across from the barracks and by Highway 6. After the library continued to grow, Mae S. Bruce presented a  brick structure to the city in 1987. The library moved to the structure and it was renamed after Bruce.

Transportation
Airports in unincorporated areas near Santa Fe include:

 Creasy Airport
 Varnell Heliport

Airports with scheduled commercial airline service for the area, located in Houston, are William P. Hobby Airport and George Bush Intercontinental Airport. Scholes International Airport in nearby Galveston is available for general aviation and non-scheduled commercial service.

Culture
Citing Santa Fe Independent School District v. Doe, in 2019 Skip Hollandworth described Santa Fe as "a deeply conservative community".

Notable people
 D. L. Lang, American poet who lived in Santa Fe as a child.
 Johnny Lee, Country music star best known for his 1980 hit single "Lookin' for Love"; was raised on a dairy farm in Santa Fe (then part of Alta Loma) and graduated from Santa Fe High School in 1964.

Notes

Explanatory notes

Citations

External links

 City of Santa Fe official website
 

 
Cities in Galveston County, Texas
Cities in Texas
Greater Houston